James Bolton (1735–1799) was an English naturalist and illustrator.

James Bolton may also refer to:

James W. Bolton (1869–1936), American banker, civic leader, and school board president
James C. Bolton (1899–1974), American banker, civic leader, and Baptist layman, son of James W. Bolton
James Bolton (footballer) (born 1994), English footballer
Jim Bolton (historian)

In fiction:

James "Jambo" Bolton, Hollyoaks character
James Bolton, character in The Love Hermit

See also